Donato Stampa (died 1575) was a Roman Catholic prelate who served as Bishop of Nepi e Sutri (1569–1575).

Biography
On 14 December 1569, Donato Stampa was appointed during the papacy of Pope Pius V as Bishop of Nepi e Sutri. On 8 January 1570, he was consecrated bishop by Scipione Rebiba, Cardinal-Priest of Sant'Angelo in Pescheria, with Galeazzo Gegald, Bishop Emeritus of Bagnoregio, and Umberto Locati, Bishop of Bagnoregio, serving as co-consecrators. He served as Bishop of Nepi e Sutri until his death in 1575.

References

External links and additional sources
 (for Chronology of Bishops) 
 (for Chronology of Bishops) 

16th-century Italian Roman Catholic bishops
Bishops appointed by Pope Pius V
1575 deaths